The Poznań Society for the Advancement of Arts and Sciences (PTPN) is a learned society in Poznań, Poland, established in 1857, of scholars and scientists in all branches of learning. It has been one of the largest and most important general learned organizations in Poland.

When founded in the 19th century, the Poznań Society was the chief Polish scientific and cultural organization in Prussian Poland, and until the creation of Kraków's Academy of Learning (Akademia Umiejętności) in 1871–73 it was the most important learned society in all the Polish lands. In addition to its learned activities, the Society collected and secured art works and Polish national mementos.

In 1919 the Society initiated the founding of University of Poznań (current Adam Mickiewicz University).

Presidents 
 August Cieszkowski
 Tytus Działyński
 August Cieszkowski for second time
 Karol Libelt
 Stanisław Egbert Koźmian, 
 August Cieszkowski for the third time
 Archbishop Edward Likowski
 Heliodor Święcicki
 Bronisław Dembiński
 Zygmunt Lisowski
 Zygmunt Wojciechowski, Kazimierz Tymieniecki, Stefan Barbacki, Gerard Labuda, Zdzisław Kaczmarczyk, Zbigniew Zakrzewski.

Noted members 
 August Cieszkowski (1814–94), Polish philosopher, social and political activist, co-founder of the Polish League (Liga Polska),  co-founder and president of the PTPN
 Tytus Działyński (1796–1861), Polish political activist, protector of arts
 Kazimierz Jarochowski (1828–88), Polish historian, publicist of the Dziennik Poznański (Poznań Daily), co-founder of PTPN
 Karol Libelt (1807–75), Polish philosopher, political and social activist, president of PTPN
 Teofil Matecki (1810–86), Polish physician, social activist, member of PTPN, founder of the Adam Mickiewicz monument of Poznań
 Leon Wegner (1824–73), Polish economist and historian, co-founder of PTPN

Publications 
 Badania Fizjograficzne nad Polską Zachodnią
 Roczniki Historyczne
 Roczniki Dziejów Społecznych i Gospodarczych
 Slavia Occidentalis
 Lingua Posnaniensis
 Studia Automatyki

See also 
Warsaw Society of Friends of Learning
Academy of Sciences
Polish Academy of Learning
Polish Academy of Sciences

References

External links
  Official website 
 Annals of the Society of Friends of Poznań Sciences

Society of Friends of Learning
Learned societies of Poland
Grand Duchy of Posen